Elections in Tanzania occur on both the local and national levels. The local government holds elections for street or village chair people. General elections at the national level elect the President and the members of the National Assembly. The president is elected for a five-year term.

The National Assembly 
The National Assembly, or Bunge la Jamhuri ya Muungano, has 323 members: 232 members elected for a five-year term in single-seat constituencies and 75 seats allocated to women who are elected by the political parties that are represented in the National Assembly. This depends on the majority of elected members from each political party, including the elected members from Zanzibar specific for the United Republic of Tanzania. The President appoints ministers of government from among members of the National Assembly. The Attorney General is automatically entitled to be part of the Parliament. The Prime Minister, appointed by the President from among members of the National Assembly, is the principal officer of the government business in the National Assembly.

Party System 
Tanzania has a dominant-party system with Chama Cha Mapinduzi in power (Status 2020). Chadema, NCCR–Mageuzi, and CUF are some other opposition parties represented in the National Assembly

The next general election in Tanzania will be in 2025.

Last elections

References

External links
Adam Carr's Election Archive
African Elections Database